The Neath & District League is a football league in South Wales. The league consists of four divisions, named The Premier Division, Division One, Two and Three. The Premier League is a feeder to the West Wales Premier League, and therefore sits at level 5 of the Welsh football league system.

The last team to be promoted from this league was Ynysygerwn in 2016.

Member clubs for 2022–23 season

Premier Division

Bryncoch 
Bryn Rovers
Cilfrew Rovers
FC Nedd
Glais
Glynneath Town
Harp Rovers
Llandarcy 
Neath Town 
Pontardawe 'A' 
Resolven
Rhos

Division One

Cimla
Clydach
Clydach Sports
Coed Darcy
Cwm Wanderers reserves
Cwrt Herbert Colts
Giants Grave reserves
Llandarcy reserves
Rhos reserves
Tonna 
Ynysmeudwy Athletic
Ystradgynlais

Division Two

AFC Pontardawe 'B'
Bryncoch reserves
Bryn Rovers reserves
Clydach Sports reserves
Cwm Wanderers 3rds
Glais 'B'
Neath Town 'B'
Resolven reserves
Rhos 3rds
Sevens Sisters Onllwyn reserves
Ynysygerwn 3rds
Ystradgynlais 'B'

Division Three

Bryn Rovers 3rds
Cilfrew Rovers 'B'
Clydach 'B'
Clydach 'C'
Coed Darcy reserves
Cwmamman United reserves
Cwrt Herbert Colts 'B'
Harp Rovers 'B'
Tonna 'B'
Ynysmeudwy Athletic 'B'
Ystradgynlais 'C'

Premier Division Champions
As sourced from the league's website.

External links
 Official League website

References

 
5
Sports leagues established in 1931